The 1999 Volleyball America's Cup was the second edition of the annual men's volleyball tournament, played by six countries from North-, Central- and South America. The tournament was held from October 14 to October 23, 1999, in St. Petersburg and Tampa, Florida (United States).

Squads

Main Round

Venue: Tampa, Florida
Thursday 1999-10-14

Friday 1999-10-15

Saturday 1999-10-16

Venue: St. Petersburg, Florida
Sunday 1999-10-17

Monday 1999-10-18

Tuesday 1999-10-19

Thursday 1999-10-21

Final round

Semi-finals
Venue: Tampa, Florida
Friday 1999-10-22

Finals
Venue: Tampa, Florida
Saturday 1999-10-23 — Bronze Medal Match

Saturday 1999-10-23 — Gold Medal Match

Final ranking

Awards

References
 Sports123
 Results

Volleyball America's Cup
Volleyball America's Cup
Volleyball America's Cup
Volleyball America's Cup
Volleyball in Florida
1999 in sports in Florida